Superbad is a 2007 American teen comedy film.

Superbad or Super Bad may also refer to:

Music
 Super Bad (James Brown album), 1971
 Superbad (soundtrack), 2007
 Super Bad (Terminator X album), by Terminator X 1994
 Superbad, an album by Chris Jasper
 Superbad, a 2001 album by Romina Johnson
 Superbad: The Return of Boosie Bad Azz, a 2009 album by Lil Boosie

Songs
 "Super Bad" (song), by James Brown
 "Superbad" (Flux Pavilion and Doctor P song), 2011
 "Superbad", a song by Adrienne Bailon
 "Super Bad", a song by Idris Muhammad
 "Superbad", a 1987 song by Chris Jasper
 "Superbad (11:34)", a song by Travie McCoy on the album Lazarus
 "Superbad", a 2014 song by Jesse McCartney from In Technicolor

Other uses
 Superbad, a 2001 novel by Ben Greenman
 Superbad (website), a web art installation